Pycnora is a genus of fungi in the monotypic family Pycnoraceae. It contains three species. The genus was circumscribed by Josef Hafellner in 2001; the family was proposed by Mika Bendiksby and Einar Timdal in 2013.

Characteristics of the Pycnoraceae are the lecideine, black apothecia that consistently have asci with eight simple ascospores. The secondary chemistry of the family features dibenzofurans, particularly alectorialic acid.

References

Candelariales
Lichen genera
Ascomycota genera
Taxa described in 2001
Taxa named by Josef Hafellner